Davit Kiria (born February 9, 1988), also spelled as David Kyria, is a Georgian kickboxer who competes in the Featherweight and Lightweight divisions of ONE Championship.

Also an Ashihara karate stylist, Kiria is a former Glory Lightweight Champion and Kunlun Fight 70kg World Max Tournament Champion.

Combat Press ranked him as the #5 lightweight kickboxer in the world in August 2021. peaking as high as #1 in September 2014.

Background
Born in Zugdidi, Georgia, and started learning Ashihara karate at age of nine in the Ashihara International Karate Organization (AIKO), Kiria later relocated to the Netherlands to train under AIKO founder Dave Jonkers at the Golden Glory gym in Zuidlaren, where he is a training partner of legendary heavyweight Sem Schilt. He began kickboxing at fifteen years old after a career in full contact karate in which he won the 2009 Kyokushinkai Karate Kamakura European Championship  of the International Budo Kai organization.

Career
In 2008, he reached the final of the Ring Masters Olympia 2008 Welterweight Tournament in Istanbul, Turkey but lost to the great Somrak Kamsing by decision after three rounds. Following this, Kiria moved up to middleweight and continued to gain experience by fighting his way through the Dutch kickboxing scene. On April 17, 2010, he competed in the Superfighters 8 Man Tournament in Frankfurt, Germany. Despite losing to Marco Piqué by an extension round decision in the quarter-finals, he was still given a slot in the semis by replacing Shemsi Beqiri who coundn't continue due to a broken nose. He was then eliminated from the competition by losing a decision to Chris van Venpoep.

After tough losses against some of the sport's most experienced fighters, Kiria finally got the break-out win of his career when he defeated the K-1 and It's Showtime veteran William Diender by decision after five rounds in Assen, Netherlands.

He was then pitted against the up-and-coming Robin van Roosmalen at United Glory 13: 2010-2011 World Series Semifinals in Charleroi, Belgium on March 19, 2011, losing via unanimous decision in a "Fight of the Night" display.

Kiria then moved up to the 74 kg/163 lb weight class from his usual 70 kg/154 lb to take on one of the world's top fighters in Nieky Holzken at United Glory 15 in Moscow, Russia on March 23, 2012. He lost by unanimous decision.

Despite having gone 0–2 in the Glory promotion, he was included in the 2012 Middleweight Slam tournament, replacing Cosmo Alexandre to join sixteen of the world's best fighters at 70 kg/154 lb. The tournament kicked off in Stockholm, Sweden at Glory 1: Stockholm - 2012 Middleweight Slam First 16 on May 26, 2012, and Kiria caused a major upset by taking a unanimous decision win over Muay Thai stylist Kem Sitsongpeenong. Kem seemed uncomfortable without the use of elbows and clinching and was outboxed throughout the duration of the match. Kiria also floored the Thai star with a mawashi geri in the opening round to ensure the points victory.

Advancing to the tournament final eight at Glory 3: Rome - 2012 Middleweight Slam Final 8 in Rome, Italy on November 3, 2012, Kiria was drawn against Shemsi Beqiri at the quarter-finals. After an action-packed three rounds, Kiria was given the nod via split decision and headed into the semis to face eventual tournament winner Giorgio Petrosyan, who won by a unanimous points verdict. Despite coming back from the Glory tournament empty-handed, Kiria proved himself to be amongst the middleweight elite, and moved into the top ten in the world rankings in December 2012, coming in at #7.

He showcased exceptionable boxing skills and an impenetrable defence en route to a unanimous decision victory over Yuri Bessmertny at Glory 7: Milan in Milan, Italy on April 20, 2013.

Kiria took a unanimous decision over Murthel Groenhart at Glory 10: Los Angeles - Middleweight World Championship Tournament in Ontario, California, United States on September 28, 2013.

He rematched Robin van Roosmalen in the semi-finals of the Glory 12: New York - Lightweight World Championship Tournament in New York City, New York, US on November 23, 2013, losing a unanimous decision.

Glory Lightweight Championship
Replacing Ky Hollenbeck who withdrew from the fight, Kiria faced Andy Ristie for the inaugural Glory Lightweight Championship at Glory 14: Zagreb in Zagreb, Croatia on March 8, 2014. He trailed to his Surinamese opponent for the first three rounds and was knocked down with a step knee in the second, but mounted a late comeback in the championship rounds and finished Ristie in the fifth to take the belt.

He was scheduled to fight Robin van Roosmalen for the Glory Lightweight title. Roosmalen won the fight by majority decision.

He fought a rematch with Jonay Risco during Enfusion 66. Kiria lost a unanimous decision.

Kiria won his next two fights. He beat Anatoly Moiseev by decision and Nordin Ben Moh by KO.

Kunlun Fight 70kg World Max Tournament Champion
He participated in the 2019 Kunlun Fight World Max Tournament. He beat Feng Xingli by TKO in the semifinals, and beat Marouan Toutouh by split decision in the finals.

ONE Championship
On May 18, 2020, it was reported that Kiria had signed with ONE Championship. He is set to make his promotional debut against 2019 ONE Featherweight Kickboxing World Grand Prix Champion Giorgio Petrosyan at ONE Championship: Fists Of Fury on February 26, 2021. Kiria lost the fight by unanimous decision.

Kiria faced Enriko Kehl in the quarter-finals of the 2021 ONE Kickboxing Featherweight World Grand Prix at ONE Championship: First Strike. Kiria won by first-round technical knockout. Kiria was booked to face Sitthichai Sitsongpeenong in the semifinals of the ONE Featherweight Kickboxing World Grand Prix at ONE: Only the Brave on January 28, 2022. Kiria lost by unanimous decision.

Kiria faced Mohammed Boutasaa at ONE 157 on May 20, 2022. He lost the fight by unanimous decision.

Kiria faced Mickael Pignolo for the vacant NDC -72 kg championship at Nuit Des Champions 29 on November 19, 2022. He captured the vacant title by a second-round knockout.

Kiria faced Johannes Baas at Mix Fight Championship on December 3, 2022. He won the fight by unanimous decision.

Personal life
Kiria has two daughters.

Championships and awards

Karate
International Budo Kai
2009 Kyokushinkai Karate Kamakura European Champion

Kickboxing
Nuit Des Champions
2022 Nuit Des Champions -72 kg Championship
Glory
Glory Lightweight (-70 kg/154 lb) Championship (one time; first)
Kunlun Fight
2018 Kunlun Fight World Max Tournament Champion
Mixed Fighting Network
MFN Champion

Savate
Kungfu World Cup Champion
2017 KFWC Savate Pro -70 kg Champion

Kickboxing record

|-  style="background:#cfc;"
| 2022-12-03 || Win ||align=left| Johannes Baas || Mix Fight Championship || Frankfurt, Germany || Decision (Unanimous) || 3 || 3:00 
|-
|-  style="background:#cfc;"
| 2022-11-19 || Win ||align=left| Mickael Pignolo || Nuit Des Champions 29 || Marseille, France || TKO (Referee stoppage/Punch) || 2 ||
|-
! style=background:white colspan=9 | 
|-
|-  style="background:#fbb;"
| 2022-05-20|| Loss ||align=left| Mohammed Boutasaa || ONE 157 || Kallang, Singapore || Decision (Unanimous) || 3 || 3:00
|-
|- style="background:#fbb;"
| 2022-01-28|| Loss ||align=left| Sitthichai Sitsongpeenong || ONE: Only the Brave || Kallang, Singapore || Decision (Unanimous) || 3 || 3:00   
|-
! style=background:white colspan=9 |

|- style="background:#cfc;"
| 2021-10-15|| Win ||align=left| Enriko Kehl || ONE Championship: First Strike || Kallang, Singapore || TKO (3 Knockdown Rule/Punches) || 1 || 2:50 
|-
! style=background:white colspan=9 |

|-  style="background:#fbb;"
| 2021-02-26|| Loss ||align=left| Giorgio Petrosyan || ONE Championship: Fists Of Fury || Kallang, Singapore || Decision (Unanimous) || 3 || 3:00
|-
|- style="background:#cfc;"
|  2019-02-24 || Win || align="left" | Marouan Toutouh || Kunlun Fight 80, Final ||Shanghai, China || Decision (Split) || 3 || 3:00
|-
! style=background:white colspan=9 |
|-
|- style="background:#cfc;"
|  2019-02-24 || Win || align="left" | Feng Xingli || Kunlun Fight 80, Semi Finals ||Shanghai, China || TKO (Left front kick to the body)|| 3 || 1:13
|-
|- style="background:#cfc;"
|  2018-10-13 || Win|| align="left" | Nordin Ben Moh || Kunlun Fight 77: Hollow Throne, Quarter Finals ||Tongling, China || KO (Left Hook)||3|| 2:56
|-
|- style="background:#cfc;"
|  2018-08-05 || Win|| align="left" | Anatoly Moiseev  || Kunlun Fight 75 || Sanya, China || Decision (Unanimous) || 3 || 3:00
|-  style="background:#fbb;"
| 2018-05-05 || Loss ||align=left| Jonay Risco ||Enfusion Live 66  || Tenerife, Spain || Decision (Unanimous)|| 5 || 3:00
|-
|-  style="background:#cfc;"
| 2017-11-24|| Win ||align=left| Ludovic Nassibou || 2017 Kungfu World Cup -70 kg Final || Paris, France || Decision (unanimous) || 3 || 3:00
|-
! style=background:white colspan=9 |
|-
|-  style="background:#cfc;"
| 2017-11-24|| Win ||align=left| Sergey Kulyaba || 2017 Kungfu World Cup -70 kg Semi-Finals || Paris, France || Decision (unanimous) || 3 || 3:00
|-
|-  style="background:#fbb;"
| 2017-11-12 || Loss ||align=left| Superbon Banchamek || Kunlun Fight 67 - World MAX 2017 Final 8 || Sanya, China || Decision (Majority) || 3 || 3:00 
|-
|-  style="background:#cfc;"
| 2017-08-27|| Win ||align=left| Marouan Toutouh || kunlun Fight 65 – 70 kg World Max 2017  Tournament 1/8 Finals || Qingdao, China || Decision (unanimous) || 3 || 3:00
|-
|-  style="background:#fbb;"
| 2017-06-24 || Loss ||align=left| Marouan Toutouh || Kunlun Fight 63  || Sanya, China || Ext. R Decision (Majority) || 4 || 3:00
|-  style="background:#cfc;"
| 2017-03-11 || Win ||align=left| Cristian Milea || Kunlun Fight 58/ Magnum Fc 1, 70kg Qualifier Tournament 3 Final B  || Rome, Italy || TKO (low kicks) || 1 || 
|-
|-  style="background:#cfc;"
| 2017-03-11 || Win ||align=left| Jonay Risco || Kunlun Fight 58/ Magnum Fc 1, 70kg Qualifier Tournament 3 Semi-Final B  || Rome, Italy || Decision (unanimous) || 3 || 3:00
|-
|-  style="background:#fbb;"
| 2017-01-01 || Loss ||align=left| Jomthong Chuwattana || Kunlun Fight 56 - World MAX 2016, Semi Finals || Sanya, China || Ext. R Decision || 4 || 3:00
|-  style="background:#cfc;"
| 2016-10-30 || Win ||align=left| Mohamed Mezouari || Kunlun Fight 54 - World MAX 2016 Final 8  || Wuhan, China || Forfeit || 1 || 0:00
|-
|-  style="background:#cfc;" 
| 2016-09-11 || Win ||align=left| Dzianis Zuev || Kunlun Fight 52 - World MAX 2016 Final 16  || Fuzhou, China || Decision (unanimous) || 3 || 3:00
|-
|-  style="background:#cfc;"
| 2016-07-31 || Win ||align=left| Robbie Hageman || Kunlun Fight 48 - World MAX 2016 Reserve Fight || Jining, China || Decision (unanimous) || 3 || 3:00
|-
|-  style="background:#fbb;"
| 2016-04-08 || Loss ||align=left| Tayfun Özcan || Kunlun Fight 41 - World MAX 2016 Group G Tournament Semi Finals || Xining, China || Decision (unanimous) || 3 || 3:00
|-  style="background:#fbb;"
| 2016-03-12 || Loss ||align=left| Sitthichai Sitsongpeenong || Glory 28: Paris - Lightweight Contender Tournament, Semi Finals || Paris, France, || Decision (unanimous) || 3 || 3:00
|-  style="background:#fbb;"
| 2015-12-19 || Loss ||align=left| Enriko Gogokhia || Kunlun Fight 35 - World MAX 2015 Final 8  || Luoyang, China || Decision || 3 || 3:00
|-  style="background:#cfc;"
| 2015-10-28 || Win ||align=left| David Calvo || Kunlun Fight 32 - World MAX 2015 Final 16  || China || TKO (3 Knockdowns) || 2 || 3:00
|-
! style=background:white colspan=9 |
|-  style="background:#fbb;"
| 2015-06-05 || Loss ||align=left| Sitthichai Sitsongpeenong || Glory 22: Lille - Lightweight Contender Tournament, Semi Finals || Lille, France, ||  KO (knee to the body) || 2 || 2:09
|-  style="background:#cfc;"
| 2015-02-01 || Win ||align=left| Zheng Zhaoyu || Kunlun Fight 18 || Guangzhou, China || KO (Right hook) || 1 || 
|-  style="background:#fbb;"
| 2014-11-07 || Loss ||align=left| Robin van Roosmalen || Glory 18: Oklahoma || Oklahoma City, Oklahoma, USA || Decision (majority) || 5 || 3:00
|-
! style=background:white colspan=9 | 
|-  style="background:#cfc;"
| 2014-03-08 || Win ||align=left| Andy Ristie || Glory 14: Zagreb || Zagreb, Croatia || KO (punches) || 5 || 2:22 
|-
! style=background:white colspan=9 | 
|-  style="background:#fbb;"
| 2013-11-23 || Loss ||align=left| Robin van Roosmalen  || Glory 12: New York - Lightweight World Championship Tournament, Semi Finals || New York City, New York, USA || Decision (unanimous) || 3 || 3:00
|-  style="background:#cfc;"
| 2013-09-28 || Win ||align=left| Murthel Groenhart  || Glory 10: Los Angeles || Ontario, California, USA || Decision (unanimous) || 3 || 3:00
|-  style="background:#cfc;"
| 2013-04-20 || Win ||align=left| Yuri Bessmertny  || Glory 7: Milan || Milan, Italy || Decision (unanimous) || 3 || 3:00
|-  style="background:#fbb;"
| 2012-11-03 || Loss ||align=left| Giorgio Petrosyan || Glory 3: Rome - 70 kg Slam Tournament, Semi Finals || Rome, Italy || Decision (unanimous) || 3 || 3:00
|-  style="background:#cfc;"
| 2012-11-03 || Win ||align=left| Shemsi Beqiri || Glory 3: Rome - 70 kg Slam Tournament, Quarter Finals || Rome, Italy || Decision (split) || 3 || 3:00
|-  style="background:#cfc;"
| 2012-05-26 || Win ||align=left| Kem Sitsongpeenong || Glory 1: Stockholm - 70 kg Slam Tournament, First Round || Stockholm, Sweden || Decision (unanimous) || 3 || 3:00
|-  style="background:#fbb;"
| 2012-03-23 || Loss ||align=left| Nieky Holzken || United Glory 15 || Moscow, Russia || Decision (unanimous) || 3 || 3:00
|-  style="background:#cfc;"
| 2011-11-12 || Win ||align=left| Marvin Sansaar || Glorious Heroes Part II || Assen, Netherlands || TKO (punches) || 1 || 
|-  style="background:#fbb;"
| 2011-03-19 || Loss ||align=left| Robin van Roosmalen || United Glory 13: 2010-2011 World Series Semifinals || Charleroi, Belgium || Decision (unanimous) || 3 || 3:00
|-  style="background:#cfc;"
| 2010-11-13 || Win ||align=left| Ulli Schick || Glorious Heroes Part I || Assen, Netherlands || Decision || 3 || 3:00
|-  style="background:#cfc;"
| 2010-10-09 || Win ||align=left| William Diender || Ring Rage Part V || Assen, Netherlands || Decision || 5 || 3:00
|-  style="background:#cfc;"
| 2010-04-17 || Win ||align=left| Chris van Venrooij || Superfighters 8 Man Tournament, Semi Finals || Frankfurt, Germany || Decision || 3 || 3:00
|-  style="background:#fbb;"
| 2010-04-17 || Loss ||align=left| Marco Piqué || Superfighters 8 Man Tournament, Quarter Finals || Frankfurt, Germany || Extension round decision || 4 || 3:00
|-  style="background:#fbb;"
| 2009-06-20 || Loss ||align=left| Milo El Geubli || Fight 058 || Leeuwarden, Netherlands || Decision || 3 || 3:00
|- style="background:#fbb;"
| 2008-11-01 || Loss || align="left" | Somrak Kamsing || Ring Masters Olympia 2008, Welterweight Tournament Final || Istanbul, Turkey || Decision || 3 || 3:00
|-
! style=background:white colspan=9 |
|-  style="background:#cfc;"
| 2008-11-01 || Win ||align=left| Aydin Tuncay || Ring Masters Olympia 2008, Welterweight Tournament Semi Finals || Istanbul, Turkey || Decision || 3 || 3:00
|- style="background:#fbb;"
| 2008-07-06 || Loss || align="left" | Faldir Chahbari || Ultimate Glory 8 || Nijmegen, Netherlands || TKO (Doc Stop/Cut) || 2 || 
|-  style="background:#cfc;"
| 2007-11-17 || Win ||align=left| Marvin Sansaar || Battle Under the Tower 2007 || Steenwijk, Netherlands ||  ||  || 
|- style="background:#c5d2ea;"
| 2007-06-11 || Draw || align="left" | Sornsuk || Beatdown 6 || Amsterdam, Netherlands || Decision || 3 || 3:00
|-
| colspan=9 | Legend:

See also
 List of male kickboxers

References

External links
 Official ONE Championship profile
 Official Glory profile

1988 births
Living people
Male kickboxers from Georgia (country)
Welterweight kickboxers
Middleweight kickboxers
Male karateka from Georgia (country)
Ashihara kaikan practitioners
Expatriate sportspeople from Georgia (country) in the Netherlands
People from Zugdidi
Glory kickboxers
ONE Championship kickboxers
Kunlun Fight kickboxers
Kunlun Fight kickboxing champions